Events from the year 1788 in art.

Events
 Étienne Maurice Falconet becomes director of the Académie des beaux-arts.

Works
 Thomas Barrett – Charlotte Medal
 James Barry – King Lear Weeping over the Dead Body of Cordelia (1786–88)
 Jacques-Louis David – Portrait of Antoine-Laurent Lavoisier and his Wife
 Marguerite Gérard – First Steps (approximate date)
 Francisco Goya
 Manuel Osorio Manrique de Zuñiga ("Red Boy", 1787–88)
 The Meadow of San Isidro
 St. Francis of Borja Attending a Dying Man
 Anton Graff – Thomas Bruce, 7th Earl of Elgin
 Guillaume Guillon-Lethière - Brutus Condemning His Sons to Death
 Sir Joshua Reynolds
 The Age of Innocence (probable date)
 Lord Heathfield
 Johann Zoffany – Colonel Mordaunt's Cock Match

Births
 February 5 – Sarah Goodridge, American painter who specialized in miniatures (died 1853)
 February 24 – Johan Christian Dahl, Norwegian landscape painter (died 1857)
 February 29 – Catharine Hermine Kølle, Norwegian adventurer and painter (died 1859)
 March 12 – Pierre Jean David, sculptor and engraver ("David d'Angers") (died 1856)
 April 5 – Franz Pforr, painter (died 1812)
 April 18 – Charles de Steuben, French painter active during the Napoleonic Era (died 1856)
 April 20 – Emma Körner, German painter (died 1815)
 April 24 – Ammi Phillips, American painter (died 1865)
 June 18 - Ernesta Legnani Bisi, Italian painter and engraver (died 1859)
 September 8 – William Collins, English landscape and genre painter (died 1847)
 August 6 – Felix Slade, founder of the Slade School of Art (died 1868)
 November 4 – Jacques-Édouard Gatteaux, French sculptor and medal engraver (died 1881)
 date unknown
 Michele Bisi, Italian engraver and painter (date of death unknown)
 Albertus Jonas Brandt, Dutch still-life painter (died 1821)
 Martin Cregan, Irish portrait painter (died 1870)
 John Watson Gordon, painter (died 1864)
 Michael Hanhart, British lithographer and chromolithographer (died 1865)
 Mary Harrison, English flower and fruit painter, and illustrator (died 1875)
 Emma Eleonora Kendrick, British miniature painter (died 1871)
 Paolo Toschi, Italian draughtsman and engraver (died 1854)
 William Edward West, American portrait painter (died 1859)

Deaths
 February 13 – Josef Jáchym Redelmayer, Czech painter, fresco painter and theater decorator (born 1727)
 February 17 – Maurice Quentin de La Tour, French Rococo portraitist who worked primarily with pastels (born 1704)
 March 2 – Solomon Gessner, Swiss painter and poet (born 1730)
 May 29 – Jacques Aliamet, French engraver (born 1726)
 July 15 – Jean Germain Drouais, French historical painter (born 1763)
 August 2 – Thomas Gainsborough, English portrait painter (born 1727)
 September 27 – Sir Robert Taylor, stonemason, sculptor, and architect (born 1714)
 September 30 – Matthäus Günther, German painter and artist of the Baroque and Rococo era (born 1705)
 December 30  – Francesco Zuccarelli, Italian Rococo painter, elected in 1763 to the Venetian Academy of Fine Arts (born 1702)
 date unknown
 Fabio Berardi, Italian engraver (born 1728)
 Joseph Bergler the Elder, Austrian sculptor (born 1718)
 Carlo Bonavia, Italian veduta painter (date of birth unknown)
 Gaspard Duché de Vancy, French painter and drawer (born 1756)
 George Farington, English artist (born 1752)
 Toriyama Sekien, scholar and ukiyo-e artist of Japanese folklore (born 1712)
 François-Gaspard Teuné, French ébéniste (cabinet-maker) (born 1726)
 Min Zhen, Chinese painter and seal carver born in Nanchang in Jiangxi (born 1730)

References

 
Years of the 18th century in art
1780s in art